Lucky to Be Alive is the seventh studio album by the American country music band Confederate Railroad. The project marks the first album release in nine years for the Grammy-nominated group, and was released on July 15 to music retailers nationwide. The ACM award-winning band are also bringing the star power on the album, with guest appearances from Willie Nelson, John Anderson, Colt Ford and former NFL coach, Jerry Glanville, on a special 20th Anniversary version of the signature smash, “Trashy Women.”

Track listing
"Lucky to Be Alive" (Danny Shirley, Blue Miller, Sonny LeMaire) – 3:14
"Played the Game" (Roger Alan Wade) – 3:29
"If I Ever Cross That Line" (Shirley, Miller, LeMaire) – 3:46
"The Man I Am Today" (Shirley, Miller) – 3:20
"Trashy Women (20th Anniversary)" featuring Willie Nelson, John Anderson and Colt Ford (Chris Wall, Colt Ford)  – 3:40
"Somebody Like You" (Shirley, Miller, LeMaire) – 3:21
"Goodbye Song" (Shirley, Miller, LeMaire) – 3:10
"Whiskey And Women" (Shirley, Tony Stampley, Larry Alderman) – 3:34
"Fast Cars, Guitars, and Fine Tuned Women" (Tony Stampley, Buck Moore, John Northrup, Ken Randolph) – 3:17
"I’m Not Fallin’ For That" (Bobby Randall, Rusty Hendrix) – 3:38
"Psycho Bitch From Hell (Live)" (Wade) – 3:18
"Don’t Feel as Young as I Used To" (Shirley, Miller, Tim Austin) – 3:16

Personnel
Confederate Railroad
 Rusty Hendrix - electric guitar
 Mark Dufresne - drums
 Bobby Randall - steel guitar, fiddle, vocals
 Mo Thaxton - guitar, vocals
 Wayne Secrest - bass guitar
 Danny Shirley - acoustic guitar, lead vocals

Chart performance

References

 Lucky To Be Alive at confederaterailroad.net

2016 albums
Confederate Railroad albums